Fort Chesterfield is a name given to several establishments or ships.  Things names Fort Chesterfield include:

 Fort Chesterfield, a North West Company trading post built in 1791 on the South Saskatchewan River in Saskatchewan, Canada, about twelve miles from the modern village of Empress, Alberta
 Fort Chesterfield, an early 19th-century military fort near the town of Marigot, in the French quarter of Saint Martin
 Fort Chesterfield, a rebel fort on the north bank of the Appomattox River during the American Civil War
 Fort Chesterfield, a British warship built in 1943 (later renamed Hawk, then Cabahawk under owners from Panama and the Bahamas)
 Fort Chesterfield (schooner), a Hudson's Bay Company's motor schooner which served communities along Hudson Bay during the 1920s

See also

Chesterfield (disambiguation)

Set index articles on ships